Zanger is a surname. Notable people with the surname include:

 Johann Zanger (1557–1607), German jurist and professor of law
 Marcel Zanger (1973–2016), German boxer
 Walter Zanger (1930s–2015), American-born Israeli author, tour guide, and television personality
 Wolfgang Zanger (born 1968), Austrian politician

See also 
 Zanger Rinus (born 1969), Dutch singer
 Bala Zanger
 Pa'in Zanger

German-language surnames